Strada provinciale 3 Minervino-Spinazzola (SP 3), previously known as  Strada regionale 6 della Murgia Centrale (SR 6), is a provincial road in Apulia, the route of which takes place entirely in the province of Barletta-Andria-Trani.

History
The former SR 6 (now SP 3) was built to avoid the isolation of the inland municipalities, Minervino Murge and Spinazzola and allow them quick access to Autostrada A14. It also assumes great importance in the road infrastructure of the new Apulian province, allowing a quick connection with the capital municipalities.

The management was transferred from the Apulian Region to the Province of Bari (now the Metropolitan City of Bari). Since 2 November 2009, it has been managed by the Province of Barletta-Andria-Trani. With the transition to the new province, the road received the name of provincial road 3 Minervino-Spinazzola.

The former regional road 6 was opened to traffic, initially limited to the first section of Canosa di Puglia - Minervino Murge (about ), on 6 November 2009.

References 

6
Transport in Apulia